Torolv Solheim (7 November 1907, Radøy – 23 May 1995) was a Norwegian educator, essayist, resistance member and politician. He was originally a politician for the Communist Party of Norway, later a member of the Norwegian Labour Party, he was among the initiators of the Socialist People's Party, founded in 1961, and its chairman from 1969 to 1971. He was later a member of the Socialist Left Party. He edited the magazine Fossegrimen from 1954 to 1968.

References

1907 births
1995 deaths
People from Radøy
Norwegian resistance members
Communist Party of Norway politicians
Labour Party (Norway) politicians
Socialist Left Party (Norway) politicians